Andy Murray was the defending champion, but could not participate this year as he was recovering from hip surgery.

Roberto Bautista Agut won the title, defeating Lucas Pouille in the final, 6–3, 6–4.

Seeds

Draw

Finals

Top half

Bottom half

Qualifying

Seeds

Qualifiers

Lucky loser
  Blaž Kavčič

Qualifying draw

First qualifier

Second qualifier

Third qualifier

Fourth qualifier

References
 Main draw
 Qualifying draw

Men's Singles